The 1979 Utah Utes football team was an American football team that represented the University of Utah as a member of the Western Athletic Conference (WAC) during the 1979 NCAA Division I-A football season. In their third season under head coach Wayne Howard, the Utes compiled an overall record of 6–6 with a mark of 5–2 against conference opponents, placing second in the WAC. Home games were played on campus at Robert Rice Stadium in Salt Lake City.

Schedule

Roster

NFL draft
One Utah player was selected in the 1980 NFL Draft.

References

Utah
Utah Utes football seasons
Utah Utes football